During the Francoist dictatorship of Spain, after the Spanish Civil War, the caudillo Francisco Franco created the Regency Council. During his visit to Portugal, from 22 October 1949 to 27 October 1949 several individuals acted as a collegial regency.  Otherwise Franco himself held the role until he died on 20 November 1975. It then passed, for two days, to Alejandro Rodríguez de Valcárcel, to allow for the formalities surrending the restoration of the House of Bourbon, in the person of King Juan Carlos.

Presidents of Regency Council (1947–1975)

See also 
 List of Spanish Regents

References 

Political history of Spain
Regents
 
Heads of state of Spain